Cantate FM is a Catholic radio station in Votorantim, São Paulo, broadcasting for the entire region of Sorocaba and online on the official website. The station is part of the Catholic Charismatic Renewal movement, came from the Community and Alliance Life Cantate Domino and the granting of radio Cantate, was published in the official journal of the Union (Brazil), on July 8, 2004 by the then President of the Federal Senate, Senator Jose Sarney. It operates at 104.5 FM in Votorantim, Sorocaba and region.

References

External links
Technical data from ANATEL

Catholic radio stations
Radio stations in Brazil